Stefan Stefanović (1797–1865), known as Tenka (Тенка), was a Serbian politician who served as the Prime Minister of Serbia. Stefanović was a leader of pro-Obrenović group that conspired against Prince Alexander Karađorđević. As a result, in 1840, Tenka Stefanović was forced to join a group of Constitutionalists (Toma Vučić-Perišić, Avram Petronijević, Milutin Garašanin and his two sons Luka and Ilija Garašanin, Stojan Simić, Matija Nenadović, Lazar Teodorović) who were sent in exile to Constantinople.

References

1797 births
1865 deaths
19th-century Serbian people
Serbian politicians
Principality of Serbia
Serbian writers
Education ministers of Serbia